"The Name of the Doctor" is the thirteenth and final episode of the seventh series of the British science fiction television series Doctor Who. It was first broadcast on BBC One on 18 May 2013. It was written by Steven Moffat and directed by Saul Metzstein. The episode was watched by 7.45 million viewers in the UK and received positive reviews from critics.

In the episode, an entity called the Great Intelligence (Richard E. Grant) kidnaps Victorian-era detectives Madame Vastra (Neve McIntosh) and Jenny Flint (Catrin Stewart) and their butler Strax (Dan Starkey) to force their friend, time-travelling alien the Doctor (Matt Smith), to go to the planet Trenzalore, the site of the Doctor's future grave. The Intelligence's plan is to trap the Doctor and then force the Doctor to open a door in time so the Intelligence can reverse all the Doctor's victories.

Plot

Mini-episodes and supplementary material
"She Said, He Said" is a mini-episode that acts as a prelude to "The Name of the Doctor", in which the Eleventh Doctor and Clara each have a monologue about how little they know about each other and that they discovered each other's secret at Trenzalore.

A second mini-episode, entitled "Clarence and the Whisper Men", depicts the imprisoned Victorian murderer Clarence DeMarco being threatened by the Whisper Men (whom he believes to be a figment of his deranged imagination) into learning a set of space-time coordinates - promising him, in return, a "long, full life", though one overshadowed by his fear of them.

Also released to promote the episode were three "Strax Field Reports", in the first of which, subtitled "The Name of the Doctor", Strax informed the Sontarans of a great battle predicted to occur and admitting suspicions that it had to do with the Doctor's greatest secret. He informed Sontar that the operation was called "The Name of the Doctor". In the second, subtitled "A Glorious Day Is Almost Upon Us...", Strax discussed a 'glorious day' in which death was likely. The final field report – "The Doctor's Greatest Secret" – discussed the cliffhanger, commenting that this new Doctor had the appearance of a warrior. This was the only field report released after the episode.

Synopsis
In 1893, Madame Vastra and Jenny Flint are given information concerning the Doctor by Clarence DeMarco, in return for a stay on his execution. They use soporific drugs to hold a conference call through time and space between themselves, Strax, River Song, and Clara, in a dream. Vastra repeats DeMarco's words: "The Doctor has a secret he will take to the grave, and it is discovered." During their conference, eyeless humanoids called Whisper Men kidnap Vastra and Strax and kill Jenny. The Great Intelligence tells Clara to tell the Doctor that his friends are "lost" unless he goes to Trenzalore.

The Doctor and Clara travel to Trenzalore, the planet holding his future grave, to save his friends. The planet is covered with tombstones, the result of a great war, while a future version of the TARDIS (having deteriorated and grown to enormous size) stands above the graveyard. The duo are attacked by Whisper Men. An echo of River, still telepathically linked to Clara, helps direct the two to an escape route that leads to the giant TARDIS. Strax, Vastra, and Jenny (who is revived by Strax) are awakened by Whisper Men and meet the Great Intelligence.

The Great Intelligence threatens to kill the Doctor's allies unless the Doctor says his name to unlock the TARDIS doors. The Doctor refuses, but as he speaks, River says the Doctor's name and unlocks the TARDIS. Inside, the Doctor reveals a pulsating column of light to be his time stream. The Great Intelligence enters it in order to undo the Doctor's past as revenge for all the defeats it has been dealt. The positive effects of the Doctor's travels begin to be nullified by the Intelligence's interference. Jenny disappears, while Strax, having forgotten his history with Madame Vastra, attacks her and she vaporizes him in self-defense.

Clara remembers the Doctor telling her that she has helped the Doctor in other places in time and space. She enters the time stream to restore the Doctor's timeline, bringing Jenny and Strax back in the process. Echoes of Clara fall through space and time and appear in adventures of the Doctor's previous incarnations. The Doctor enters the column of light to save the original Clara, guiding her from a place where she sees several previous incarnations of the Doctor. Reunited, the two spot another figure in the shadows which Clara does not recognise. The Doctor explains the elderly figure is another past incarnation of himself, but what he did in the past was not in the Doctor's name. The figure turns around, revealing himself to be the War Doctor, the incarnation who fought during the great Time War.

Continuity
Imagery of the Doctor's prior incarnations is used during scenes in which Clara and the Great Intelligence interact with the Doctor. Footage of the First (from The Aztecs, 1964, with dialogue from The Web Planet, 1965), Second, Third (both from The Five Doctors, 1983), Fourth (The Invasion of Time, 1978), Fifth (Arc of Infinity, 1983), and Seventh (Dragonfire, 1987) Doctors was shown. Stunt doubles were used for some other brief appearances, including the Sixth Doctor walking past Clara while she is in a corridor. The Ninth Doctor can also be seen running past her in the Doctor's time stream. The opening scene also includes a representation of Susan Foreman and reference to the Doctor's original departure from Gallifrey (as a globed city, previously seen in "The Sound of Drums", and later seen destroyed in "The End of Time").

The Great Intelligence says that the Doctor has been "bloodsoaked" several times, talking about the leader of the Sycorax (whom the Tenth Doctor kills in "The Christmas Invasion"), Solomon the trader (whom the Eleventh Doctor sends to his death in "Dinosaurs on a Spaceship"), the Daleks, and the Cybermen. The Great Intelligence also states that the Doctor will be known as the Valeyard before the end of his life. The Valeyard appeared in the 1986 serial The Trial of a Time Lord, where he is described as an amalgamation of the darker sides of the Doctor's nature, somewhere between his twelfth and final incarnations.

John Hurt makes his first ever appearance as the War Doctor at the climax of the episode, foreshadowing the events of "The Night of the Doctor" and "The Day of the Doctor", the 50th Anniversary special, in which the events of the Time War and also the Eighth Doctor's regeneration as well as the War Doctor's own is finally explained, bridging the gap between the 1996 Television Movie and the 2005 episode Rose.

Production

Lead writer Steven Moffat stated that he wanted to have a new monster in the finale, after the series had seen the reappearance of old monsters such as the Ice Warriors, Cybermen, and Daleks. The idea of the Whisper Men came from "the thought of stylish, whispering, almost faceless creatures" which seemed frightening and appropriate for "an episode that looks forward and back".

Leak
On 12 May 2013, a week before the official premiere of "The Name of The Doctor", it was announced that 210 Doctor Who fans in the United States had received their Blu-ray box set of the second half of the seventh series early due to a production error. After successfully requesting that they not reveal the plot, the BBC sent the recipients copies of an interview with the cast. Moffat later complimented the "210 of them, with the top secret episode in their grasp – and because we asked nicely, they didn't breathe a word."

Broadcast and reception

Broadcast

"The Name of the Doctor" received overnight ratings of 5.46 million viewers on BBC One. When viewers who watched the episode later on were taken into account, the figure rose to 7.45 million, making Doctor Who the third most-watched programme of the week on BBC One. The episode received an Appreciation Index of 88.

Critical reception
The episode received positive reviews. The Guardian described the episode as "the best episode of the season", and "possibly the best finale we've seen". Mark Snow of IGN gave the episode 9.1/10, praising the final conversation between the Doctor and River Song, as well as the revelation about Clara; however he noted that the Great Intelligence was "a little underwhelming" and "not very threatening", and that while the Whispermen impressed initially, they did not "[make] a great villain." Michael Hogan of The Daily Telegraph said that the episode was "even better" than the previous two. He noted that it was "momentous, moving and thrilling". However, he also noted that the episode had "a tad too much clunking exposition, the odd spot of creaky CGI and some unconvincing metaphors about soufflés and leaves." Despite this, he called it a "breathless, brilliant finale". Some advance coverage of the story assumed the Doctor's name would actually be revealed in the episode. The episode was nominated for the 2014 Hugo Award for Best Dramatic Presentation (Short Form), along with The Day of the Doctor, An Adventure in Space and Time and The Five(ish) Doctors Reboot.

Home media
As well as being released on DVD and Blu-ray in a box set alongside the rest of the Series 7 episodes on 28 October 2013, the episode was announced as being a part of a limited edition 50th Anniversary Collection on 23 July 2014. This special DVD and Blu-ray box set was released on 8 September 2014.

References

External links

Eleventh Doctor episodes
War Doctor stories
2013 British television episodes
Television episodes written by Steven Moffat
Doctor Who multi-Doctor stories
Fiction set in 1893